Ray is a census-designated place and unincorporated community in Coosa County, Alabama, United States. Its population was 326 as of the 2020 census.

Demographics

References

Census-designated places in Coosa County, Alabama
Census-designated places in Alabama